The Citadel of Port-Louis is a citadel built in the 16th century by the Spaniards, then modified in the 17th century by the Frenchmen in Port-Louis (France).

History

Used by Spain as a base of operations during the Brittany Campaign from 1590-1598.

Description

Museums
Museum of the French East India Company (Musée de la Compagnie des Indes)
Museum of Naval Weapons (Musée des Armes Navales)
Museum of Port-Louis and the CItadel (Musée de Port-Louis et de la Citadelle)
Museum of the Arsenal (Musée de l'Arsenal)

Gallery

References

Bibliography

  François Jégou, Le port de Blavet (Port-Louis) et Jérôme d'Arradon, seigneur de Quinipily : politique et religion, Vannes, Imprimerie de Galles, 1865, 23 p.
  Henri-François Buffet, Vie et société au Port-Louis : Des origines à Napoléon III, Rennes, Bahon-Rault, 1972, 509 p.

Buildings and structures completed in the 17th century
Buildings and structures in Morbihan
Monuments historiques of Morbihan
French East India Company
Museums in Morbihan